The 40th  Daytime Creative Arts Emmy Awards, presented by the National Academy of Television Arts and Sciences (NATAS), "recognizes outstanding achievement in all fields of daytime television production and are presented to individuals and programs broadcast from 2:00 a.m. to 6:00 p.m. during the 2012 calendar year". The ceremony was held at the Westin Bonaventure in Los Angeles on June 14, 2013.

The 40th  Daytime Creative Arts Emmy Awards was hosted by Teresa Ganzel, Actress, Voice-over Actress and Comedian of The Tonight Show with Johnny Carson fame and Voice-over Actor, Bob Bergen, the voice of "Porky Pig" and others. They were joined by an illustrious group of presenters such as Susan Flannery and John McCook of The Bold and the Beautiful; Melissa Claire Egan and Ignacio Serricchio of The Young and the Restless; Arianne Zucker, James Reynolds and James Scott of Days of Our Lives; Teresa Castillo and Marc Anthony Samuel of General Hospital; Robert Scott Wilson and Denyse Tontz of All My Children; Corbin Bleu of One Life to Live; David Rudman of Sesame Street Workshop; Yvette Gonzalez-Nacer, Tara Perry and Thomas Hobson of Fresh Beat Band; and Christina Ferrare and Mark Steines of The Home and Family Show. In addition, there were several special presenters such as Geri Jewell of The Facts of Life, Mary Elizabeth McDonough of The Waltons, Leslie Miller of  Prospect Park's version of One Life to Live, and All My Children, and Tippi Hedren, the iconic actress from Alfred Hitchcock's The Birds.

The Bold and the Beautiful won the most awards, with four trophies including for Outstanding Drama Series Directing Team and five other Creative Arts Emmy Awards out of their 11 nominations.

Winners and nominees

In the lists below, the winner of the category is in bold.

References 

040 Creative Arts
Daytime Emmy Awards
Emmy Awards